Agustín Lavezzi (born 15 January 1996) is an Argentine professional footballer who plays as a midfielder for Boca Unidos.

Career
Lavezzi started out in the ranks of Rosario Central. He began his senior career in Torneo Federal B, featuring for local club Coronel Aguirre for two years from 2016 whilst making twenty-five appearances and netting eleven goals. In 2018, Lavezzi joined Primera B Nacional side Deportivo Morón. He made his first appearances in November against, for his pro debut, Gimnasia y Esgrima and Instituto, having been an unused substitute for fixtures with Villa Dálmine and Defensores de Belgrano in the previous month. Lavezzi was released in June 2020.

Personal life
Lavezzi is the nephew of fellow professional footballer Ezequiel Lavezzi.

Career statistics
.

References

External links

1996 births
Living people
People from Rosario Department
Argentine footballers
Association football midfielders
Primera Nacional players
Rosario Central footballers
Deportivo Morón footballers
Sportivo Las Parejas footballers
Racing de Córdoba footballers
Boca Unidos footballers
Sportspeople from Santa Fe Province